Club Atlético de Malabo, commonly known as Atlético de Malabo, is an Equatoguinean football club based in Malabo that plays in the National League First Division. The club have won the NLFD on three occasions and 6 Equatoguinean Cups.

Achievements
Equatoguinean Premier League: 3
1981, 1982, 2003
Equatoguinean Cup: 6
1985, 1987, 1988, 1990, 1991, 2001

Performance in CAF competitions
CAF Champions League: 1 appearance
2004 – First Round

 African Cup of Champions Clubs: 2 appearances
1982: Preliminary Round
1984: Preliminary Round

CAF Cup: 1 appearance
1998 – First Round

CAF Cup Winners' Cup: 5 appearances
1980 – First Round
1985 – Preliminary Round
1988 – First Round
1992 – Preliminary Round
2002 – First Round

Football clubs in Equatorial Guinea
Sport in Malabo